Robert Dale Reed (February 20, 1930 - March 18, 2005) was an aerospace engineer who pioneered lifting body aircraft and remotely piloted research aircraft programs for NASA at Dryden Flight Research Center.

Career
Reed, born on February 20, 1930, was an aerospace engineer who pioneered lifting body aircraft and remotely piloted research aircraft programs at Dryden Flight Research Center in 1953. Reed is also known for conducting aerodynamic loads research on the X-1E, X-5, F-100, and D-558-II aircraft.

Later life
Reed retired in 1985, but returned as a contract aerospace engineer to work on the X-33, X-36 and X-38 research vehicles, two of which featured lifting body configurations. In all, Reed managed 19 projects and designed a dozen aircraft during his career.

He died March 18, 2005, in San Diego.

Awards 

Before his retirement from NASA in 1985, Reed won four NASA awards ranging from the Exceptional Service Medal to an Associate Fellow Award.

References

Sources 

 Print
 Print.
Dunbar, Brian. "Driving Forces." NASA. NASA, 12 Jan. 2009. Web. 06 June 2014.

1930 births
2005 deaths
American aerospace engineers
NASA people